"Rock the House" is a song by Dutch house producer Afrojack. The single was released exclusively onto Beatport on 16 July 2012.

Music video
A music video to accompany the release of "Rock the House" was first released onto YouTube on 21 July 2012 at a total length of five minutes and one second.

Rock the House samples "The Landing", a tune from the soundtrack of video game Final Fantasy VIII by composer Nobuo Uematsu.

Track listing

Chart performance

Weekly charts

Year-end charts

Release history

References

External links
 Afrojack - Rock the House (Official Video)
 Listen to Rock the House on Spotify

2012 singles
Afrojack songs
Songs written by Afrojack
2012 songs